FYVE, RhoGEF and PH domain-containing protein 4 is a protein that in humans is encoded by the FGD4 gene.

References

Further reading

External links
  GeneReviews/NCBI/NIH/UW entry on Charcot-Marie-Tooth Neuropathy Type 4